Wellstone is a surname. Notable people with the surname include:

 Paul Wellstone (1944–2002), American politician
 Sheila Wellstone (1944–2002), wife of Paul

See also
 The Wellstone, novel
 Wellstone Action, non-profit organization

English-language surnames